is a passenger railway station in the city of Chikusei, Ibaraki, Japan, operated by East Japan Railway Company (JR East).

Lines
Niihari Station is served by the Mito Line, and is located 22.3 km from the official starting point of the line at Oyama Station.

Station layout
The station consists of one side platform and one island platform connected to the station building by a footbridge. The station is unattended.

Platforms

History
Niihari Station was opened on 25 September 1895.  The station was absorbed into the JR East network upon the privatization of the Japanese National Railways (JNR) on 1 April 1987.

Passenger statistics
In fiscal 2019, the station was used by an average of 581 passengers daily (boarding passengers only).

Surrounding area
former Kyowa Town Hall
Kyowa Post Office

See also
 List of railway stations in Japan

References

External links

 JR East Station Information 

Railway stations in Ibaraki Prefecture
Mito Line
Railway stations in Japan opened in 1895
Chikusei